Mora is a genus of large trees in the subfamily Caesalpinioideae of the legume family Fabaceae, (or in some classifications the family Caesalpinaceae of the order Fabales).

There are seven to ten species, all native to lowland rainforests in northern South America, southern Central America and the southern Caribbean islands. The beans of Mora spp. are edible if boiled, and are also the source of a red dyestuff. The species M. excelsa is one of the few rainforest trees to grow in pure stands.

Mora abbottii Britton & Rose — cola tree, coi, col (Caribbean)
Mora ekmanii (Urb.) Britton & Rose (Caribbean)
Mora excelsa Benth. — nato, nato rojo, mora (Trinidad and Tobago, Guyana, Suriname, Venezuela)
Mora gonggrijpii (Kleinhoonte) Sandwith — Moraboekea (Guyana, Suriname, Venezuela)
Mora megistosperma (Pittier) Britton & Rose (Costa Rica, Panama, Colombia)
Mora oleifera (Hemsl.) Ducke (Panama, Colombia)
Mora paraensis (Ducke) Ducke — pracuuba (Brazil)

Some of the species are important for timber production.  Mora excelsa and Mora gonggrijpii are also known as nato, and are commonly used in guitar body and neck construction.

References

External links
 Mora excelsa and Mora gonggrijpii

Caesalpinioideae
Trees of Guyana
Trees of Trinidad and Tobago
Fabaceae genera